The Principality of Polotsk (Polackaje kniastva), also known as the Duchy of Polotsk or Polotskian Rus', was a medieval principality of the Early East Slavs. The origin and date of state establishment is uncertain. Rus' Chronicles mention Polotsk being conquered by Vladimir the Great, and thereafter it became associated with the Rurik dynasty and Kievan Rus'.

The principality was supposedly established around the ancient town of Polotsk (modern Polatsk, Belarus) by the tribal union of Krivichs. In the second half of the 10th century, Polotsk was governed by its own dynasty; its first ruler mentioned in the chronicles was the semi-legendary Rogvolod (?–978), better known as the father of Rogneda. The principality was heavily involved in several succession crises of the 11th–12th centuries and a war with the Land of Novgorod. By the 13th century it was integrated into the Grand Duchy of Lithuania.

At the time of its greatest extent, the principality stretched over large parts of today's northern and Central Belarus and a smaller part of today's southeastern Latvia, including (besides Polotsk itself) the following towns: Vitebsk, Drutsk, Minsk, Izjaslaw (now Zaslawye), Lahojsk, Barysaw, Brachyslaw (now Braslaw), Kukeinos (now Koknese) and others.

History

Origins 
There is no exact date on record when the principality was formed; it was likely an evolutionary process. In 862 Polotsk was first mentioned in the Primary Chronicle as a town within the realm of Novgorod Rus', alongside Murom and Beloozero. Initially the Principality of Polotsk was governed by a local dynasty, and not by an appointed governor from Kiev. Local statehood was a result of local political evolution in the Early East Slavs' tribal union of Krivichs.

The second time Polotsk was mentioned was a full century later, in 980, when its ruler was a Varangian warlord, Ragnvald or Rogvolod. The chronicle reports that he arrived to Polotsk "from overseas", a routine phrase to designate Varangians. Rogvolod was an active player in the power struggle in Rus'.

In 972, after the prince of Kiev, Sviatoslav I, died, there was a power struggle between his two sons: prince of Novgorod Vladimir and prince of Kiev Yaropolk. Both had hoped for political and military support from Polotsk. In order to achieve this, Vladimir proposed to Rogneda, Rogvolod's daughter. She declined, thus making Polotsk an ally of Yaropolk. Vladimir then waged war against Polotsk. According to colorful legends recorded in the Primary Chronicle, he took the city, raped Rogneda in front of her parents, then killed her entire family and burnt down the city. Rogneda was taken to Kiev to be Vladimir's wife. Thus the local dynasty was exterminated.

After Vladimir converted to Christianity in 988 and took Anna Porphyrogeneta as his wife, he had to divorce all his previous wives, including Rogneda. She entered the convent and took the name Anastasia, then she and her son Izyaslav were exiled back to the lands of Polotsk. Thus the principality was restored but with the most senior branch of the Rurik dynasty on the local throne. Since this time, the lands of the principality became Christian (Eastern Orthodox).

Striving for independence 

In 1001 Izyaslav was succeeded by his son, Bryachislav of Polotsk. Under his rule, Polotsk attempted to distance itself from Kiev. Tensions were exacerbated by the fact that, under the East Slavic house law, since Izyaslav predeceased his father and never reigned in Kiev, his descendants from the House of Polotsk forfeited their dynastic rights to the Kievan throne. In 1020 Bryachislav sacked Novgorod but then lost it to his uncle, Yaroslav the Wise, and had to give up some of his other possessions.

For two following centuries, the Principality of Polotsk was controlled by descendants of Izyaslav. All other lands of Kievan Rus' were under control of princes who were descendants of Yaroslav the Wise.

The golden age of medieval Polotsk is associated with the rule of Bryachislav's son, Vseslav (1044–1101). He profited from the civil wars in Kiev in order to assert his own independence and run the affairs of the principality separately. During this time Polotsk became a centre of trade serving as a transit location between other lands of Kievan Rus' and Scandinavia. It also asserted its independent status balancing between Kiev, Novgorod, and the Varangians. Contemporary Norse sagas described the town as the most heavily fortified in all of Kievan Rus'. Most of the time, descendants of Izyaslav ruled the Principality of Polotsk independently of the Grand Prince of the Rus', only formally recognizing the power of the Rurikides. After the late 10th century, Polotsk was also successful in colonizing the lands of its western neighbours, the ancestors of today's Latvians and Lithuanians. In the early 13th century, Teutonic knights seized power over the former from the hands of Polotsk, but the historical ties with the latter proved much stronger and lasted for 700 more years, although the leading role in this “marriage” soon shifted to the other side. The last pagans of Europe, brave and skillful warriors, Lithuanians initially served Polotsk as auxiliary troops in its wars with the Teutonic knights and other East Slavic principalities; but from 1183 they refused obedience to the metropoly and established their own state.

The Cathedral of Saint Sophia in Polotsk – built by Vseslav between 1044 and 1066 – was a symbol of the independent-mindedness of Polotsk, rivaling churches of the same name in Novgorod and Kiev and referring to the original Hagia Sophia in Constantinople (and thus to claims of imperial prestige, authority, and sovereignty).

Decline 

After his defeat at the Battle on the river Nemiga and temporary imprisonment, Vseslav died, and the principality was divided between his surviving sons. Polotsk was splintered between various smaller fiefs – the Principality of Minsk, Principality of Vitebsk, Principality of Druck, Principality of Jersika, and Principality of Koknese. Local princes waged wars against each other trying to assert control over Polotsk. At last the rulers of Vitebsk emerged victorious. For short periods of time, the neighbouring Principality of Smolensk also claimed control over some lands of the principality.

Beginning in the mid-12th century there were changes in the lands to the west of the Principality. The fortress of Riga became the main military basis of the Livonian Brothers of the Sword. In 1209 German crusaders conquered the principalities of Jersika and Koknese in the southeast of today's Latvia, which had previously been under control of Polotsk, forcing Polotsk to permit free travel to German merchants in 1212 and ending Livonian tributes. In 1227 Smolensk ceded Polotsk by treaty to the city of Riga.

Annals affirming the alliance and united military campaigns policy of Polotsk and Lithuania. For example, The Chronicle of Novgorod informs about "Izyaslav had been set to be Knyaz in Luki and covered Novgorod from the Lithuanians" in 1198 while Luki is situated on the east from Polotsk.

The Principality of Polotsk escaped the Mongol invasion of Rus' in 1237–1239. However, pagan Lithuanians began consolidating lands of the principality, and in 1240 Polotsk became a vassal of the Grand Duchy of Lithuania. It officially became part of Lithuania in 1307, though it retained some degree of local autonomy until the 1390s. Then the principality was abolished and became part of the Połock Voivodeship.

See also 
 Prince of Polotsk
 Principality of Slutsk

References 

Subdivisions of Kievan Rus'
Medieval Belarus
Former subdivisions of Lithuania
1307 disestablishments
States and territories established in the 9th century
Principalities of the Grand Duchy of Lithuania
1300s disestablishments in Europe